At the Order of the Czar (French: Par ordre du tsar) is a 1954 French-West German historical drama film directed by André Haguet and starring Michel Simon, Colette Marchand and Jacques François. A separate German-language version Hungarian Rhapsody was also produced.

Shooting took place at the Victorine Studios in Nice and on location in Paris and the French Riviera. The film's sets were designed by the art director Roland Quignon. It was shot in Gevacolor.

Cast
 Michel Simon as Prince de Sayn-Wittgenstein
 Colette Marchand as Princess Caroline
 Jacques François as Franz Liszt
 Jacqueline Gay as Nathalie
 Willy Fritsch as Le Grand-Duc
 Lucienne Legrand as Maria Paulovna
 Yves Brainville as d'Ingelstedt
 Margot Leonard as Wanda
  as Richard Wagner

References

Bibliography 
 Mitchell, Charles P. The Great Composers Portrayed on Film, 1913 through 2002. McFarland, 2004.

External links 
 

1954 films
French historical drama films
West German films
German historical drama films
1950s historical musical films
French historical musical films
German historical musical films
1954 drama films
1950s French-language films
Films directed by André Haguet
Films set in the 1840s
Films set in the 1850s
Films set in the 1860s
Cultural depictions of Franz Liszt
Biographical films about musicians
Films about classical music and musicians
Films about composers
German multilingual films
French multilingual films
1950s multilingual films
Films shot at Victorine Studios
1950s French films
1950s German films